Yousif Muhammed Sadiq (born 14 July 1978) is an Iraqi Kurdish politician of the Movement for Change (Gorran). 

Sadiq was born in Khurmal, Halabja Governorate. He was elected as Speaker of the Parliament from April 2014 to February 2019.

References

1978 births
Living people
Iraqi Kurdistani politicians
Gorran Movement politicians
Speakers of the Kurdistan Region Parliament
Members of the Kurdistan Region Parliament